The Union of German Academies of Sciences and Humanities (German: Union der deutschen Akademien der Wissenschaften) is an umbrella organisation for eight German academies of sciences and humanities.

The member academies are:

Berlin-Brandenburg Academy of Sciences and Humanities
Göttingen Academy of Sciences and Humanities
Bavarian Academy of Sciences and Humanities
Saxon Academy of Sciences and Humanities
Heidelberg Academy of Sciences and Humanities
Akademie der Wissenschaften und der Literatur, Mainz
North Rhine-Westphalian Academy of Sciences, Humanities and the Arts
Academy of Sciences and Humanities in Hamburg

Links
Website of the Union